Al-Sahman is a sub-district located in Attyal District, Sana'a Governorate, Yemen. Al-Sahman had a population of 2441 according to the 2004 census.

References 

Sub-districts in Attyal District